Johannes (Joop) Post (born 5 July 1950, in Velsen) is a Dutch businessman and former politician.

References

1950 births
Living people
Dutch businesspeople
People from Velsen
MEPs for the Netherlands 2004–2009
Christian Democratic Appeal MEPs